Richard McGuire (born 1957) is an American illustrator, graphic novelist, children's book author, and musician. His illustrations have been published in The New York Times, The New Yorker, and Le Monde. His comic Here is among the most lauded comics from recent decades. An updated book-length version of Here was published by Pantheon Books in December 2014.

McGuire is a founding member and bassist for the band Liquid Liquid, best known for their song "Cavern", whose bass line has been frequently sampled.

Bibliography

Comics

Short stories 
 "The Dot Man," 1 pg. from Bad News #3 (Fantagraphics, 1988)
 "Here", 6 pgs. from RAW vol. 2 #1 (1989). Reprinted in An Anthology of Graphic Fiction, Cartoons and True Stories vol. 1 (Yale University Press, 2006) and Comic Art #8 (Buenaventura Press, 2006)
 "The Thinkers," 1 pg. from RAW vol. 2 #2 (1990)
 "Bon appétit," fold-out comic booklet from 2wBOX Set I (Switzerland: Bülb Comix, 2002)
 "ctrl," 6 pgs. from Timothy McSweeney's Quarterly Concern#13 (2003)

Graphic Novels 

 Here (Pantheon: 2014)

Children's literature

 The Orange Book (New York: Children's Universe, 1992)
 Night Becomes Day (New York: Viking, 1994)
 What Goes Around Comes Around (New York: Viking, 1995)
 What's Wrong With This Book? (New York: Viking, 1997)

Adult literature

 Popeye and Olive (Paris: Cornelius, 2001)
 P+O (Paris: Cornelius, 2002)

Filmography 
 "Micro Loup" (7-minute short from Loulou et autres loups, 2003)
 Peur(s) du noir (16-minute untitled segment, 2007)

References

External links 

 
A sample of his New Yorker covers
Notes from a UK comics event
 An interview on his music and comics careers
 An interview concerning his animated works
 Spoiler Alert Radio interview
 Who's Afraid of Noir- an interview
 Strapazin interview
Follow the oranges in The Orange Book

Living people
American comics artists
American illustrators
American graphic designers
American children's writers
People from New Jersey
Alternative cartoonists
Raw (magazine)
The New Yorker people
1957 births
20th-century American bass guitarists
Graphic novelists